Péter Marót (27 May 1945 – 7 June 2020) was a Hungarian fencer. He won a silver medal in the individual sabre and a bronze in the team event at the 1972 Summer Olympics.  He also competed at the 1976 Summer Olympics.

Marót died on 7 June 2020 in a traffic collision.

References

External links
 

1945 births
2020 deaths
Hungarian male sabre fencers
Olympic fencers of Hungary
Fencers at the 1972 Summer Olympics
Fencers at the 1976 Summer Olympics
Olympic silver medalists for Hungary
Olympic bronze medalists for Hungary
Olympic medalists in fencing
Sportspeople from Miskolc
Medalists at the 1972 Summer Olympics
Road incident deaths in Hungary